Berat Ridvan Djimsiti (born 19 February 1993) is a professional footballer who plays as a centre-back for  club Atalanta. Born in Switzerland to Albanian parents, he represented his birth country at youth level before choosing to play for the Albania national team.

Club career

Early career
Djimsiti was born in Zürich, Switzerland into an ethnic Albanian family, from the village of Veliki Trnovac in Serbia. He started his youth career at FC Zürich-Affoltern where he stayed until 2007, when he moved to FC Zürich academies at the age of 14.

Zürich
Djimsiti was called up to the first-team for the first time in the 2011–12 Swiss Super League season, being benched in the 2–1 victory against Young Boys on 19 April 2011. He was also part of the squad in the 2011–12 UEFA Champions League play-off round match against Bayern Munich on 17 August 2011. He made his professional debut on 3 March 2012 against Sion, coming on as a substitute in the 84th minute and replacing Heinz Barmettler in a 0–1 loss. He scored his first goal for Zürich on 20 May 2012 against Grasshopper, where he played as a starter and scored in the 75th minute to give his team a 0–1 away victory. Those were his only matches for the entire season.

He became a regular starter in the 2012–13 season.

Atalanta
On 18 January 2016, Djimsiti signed a three-and-a-half-year contract with Serie A side Atalanta, taking the number 55 for the second part of 2015–16 season. He debuted on 3 May 2016 against Napoli in a 2–1 loss.

Djimsiti returned to Atalanta ahead of 2018–19 season, playing his first match on 20 August in the 4–0 win against Frosinone. He scored his first goal for Atalanta later on 11 November, heading home his side's third goal in a 4–1 home win over Inter Milan, which ended the visitor's six-match winning streak. Since returning from his two loan spells, Djimsiti has established himself as a starting defender under Gian Piero Gasperini. 

On 17 February 2022, Djimsiti scored a brace in the first leg of the 2021–22 UEFA Europa League knockout round play-off against Olympiacos, which Atalanta won 2–1.

Loan to Avellino
On 31 August 2016, Djimsiti was loaned out to Serie B side Avellino to gain more playing time.

Loan to Benevento
On 8 July 2017, Djimsiti moved on loan to new promoted Serie A side Benevento until the end of the season, with buying option.

International career

Switzerland youth level national teams
Djimsiti became a youth national player of Switzerland as he was called up for the first time at Switzerland national under-18 football team making his debut on 5 April 2011 in a friendly match and then played in other 2 matches.

Djimsiti was then called up from the Switzerland national under-19 football team for the 2011 UEFA European Under-19 Championship qualification and made his debut against Montenegro U19 on 5 June 2011, playing the full 90- minutes match in a 2–2 win. Djimsiti also participated in the next tournament for U-19, the 2012 UEFA European Under-19 Championship playing in all 6 matches.

Following his good performances at U-19 side, he became part of the Switzerland national under-21 football team. He participated in two consecutive UEFA European Under-21 Championship, in the 2013 UEFA European Under-21 Championship where he was called up in 4 occasions, remaining in all as an unused substitute and the 2015 UEFA European Under-21 Championship playing in 2 out 6 matches.

Albania
In September 2014, Swiss media reported Djimsiti would soon receive a call-up from Albania. The news was confirmed by Djimsiti himself, who explained that he had been contacted by the Albanian coach, Gianni De Biasi. In September 2014 he refused also Kosovo, letting them know that he intended to play for Albania. On 20 September 2014, procedures to give him the Albanian citizenship were started. He received the Albanian citizenship on 15 July 2015 by the president of Albania, Bujar Nishani, along with two other Albanian footballers, the twin brothers part of the fellow Swiss club Basel, Albian Ajeti and Adonis Ajeti. In July 2015 Djimsiti confirmed definitively that he had decided to play for Albania. On 27 August 2015 Djimsiti among two other Albanian descents players which switched from Swiss youth international footballers to Albanian international footballers, Arlind Ajeti and Naser Aliji, received the go ahead from FIFA which allowed them to play for Albania also in the competitive matches such as the UEFA Euro 2016 qualifying.

Debut and UEFA Euro 2016 campaign
Since he became eligible to represent Albania in international competitive level, Djimsiti received his first call-up at Albania by coach Gianni De Biasi for the UEFA Euro 2016 qualifying matches against Denmark and Portugal on 4 and 7 September 2015 respectively. He made it his first international debut with Albania on 4 September 2015 against Denmark playing as a right back due to the absence of the injured Elseid Hysaj and completed the full 90 minutes helping Albania take one point with a goalless draw. He was called up for the next UEFA Euro 2016 qualifying Group I matches against Serbia and Armenia on 8 and 11 October 2015 respectively. He played as a centre back among Captain Lorik Cana in both matches and on 11 October against Armenia he scored his first goal in the 23rd minute following a cross from Ledian Memushaj by a free kick from the left side.

On 21 May 2016, Djimsiti was named in Albania's preliminary 27-man squad for UEFA Euro 2016, but was left out of final 23-man UEFA Euro 2016 squad on 31 May.

2018 FIFA World Cup qualification 
He was returned to Albania national team by same coach Gianni De Biasi receiving a call up for the friendly match against Morocco on 31 August 2016 and the 2018 FIFA World Cup qualification opening match against Macedonia on 5 September 2016.

Personal life
Since 2012, Djimsiti has been in a relationship with Montenegrin model Alisa Milenković.

Career statistics

Club

International

Scores and results list Albania's goal tally first, score column indicates score after each Djimsiti goal.

Honours
FC Zürich
 Swiss Cup: 2013–14,2015-16

References

External links
 Berat Djimsiti Profile at the Atalanta B.C. website
 
 
 
 Berat Djimsiti profile at FSHF.org

1993 births
Living people
Footballers from Zürich
Albanian footballers
Swiss men's footballers
Swiss people of Albanian descent
Association football central defenders
FC Zürich players
Atalanta B.C. players
U.S. Avellino 1912 players
Benevento Calcio players
Swiss Super League players
Serie A players
Serie B players
Switzerland youth international footballers
Switzerland under-21 international footballers
Albania international footballers
Albanian expatriate footballers
Albanian expatriate sportspeople in Italy
Swiss expatriate footballers
Swiss expatriate sportspeople in Italy
Expatriate footballers in Italy